Juan Ramírez was a Spanish portrait painter, who lived about the middle of the 16th century. A great number of his portraits exist at Seville and in its neighbourhood.

References

People from Seville
16th-century Spanish painters
Spanish male painters
Spanish Renaissance painters
Year of death missing
Year of birth missing